Société du pipeline sud-européen (SPSE) is an oil pipeline company established in France. It is an owner and operator of the South European Pipeline, a crude oil pipeline system which runs from Fos-sur-Mer in France to Karlsruhe in Germany.

The company was founded in 1958 by sixteen oil companies to build and operate the South European Pipeline. As of 2011, the shareholders are:
Total S.A. (27.84%)
ExxonMobil (22%)
 Société de Participations dans l'Industrie et le Transport du Pétrole (15.4%)
BP (12.1%)
Royal Dutch Shell (10.32%)
BASF (10%)
Phillips 66 (2%)

References

External links

Oil companies of France
Oil pipeline companies
TotalEnergies
ExxonMobil subsidiaries
BP subsidiaries
Shell plc
ConocoPhillips
BASF
Energy companies established in 1958
Non-renewable resource companies established in 1958
French companies established in 1958
Companies based in Île-de-France